John Bartholomew Callan (1844 – 20 April 1928) was a Dunedin lawyer and member of the New Zealand Legislative Council for one seven-year term (22 January 1907 – 21 January 1914).

Biography
Callan was born in Dublin, Ireland, in 1844. He emigrated to Victoria, Australia when he was 15. His son, also named John Bartholomew Callan (1882–1951) was a prominent judge. Callan senior established a practice with John McRae Gallaway in 1882 and traded as 'Callan And Gallaway'. Callan died in Dunedin on 20 April 1928.

References

1844 births
1928 deaths
Members of the New Zealand Legislative Council
Irish emigrants to New Zealand (before 1923)
Irish emigrants to colonial Australia
19th-century New Zealand lawyers
20th-century New Zealand lawyers
Lawyers from Dublin (city)